Yangi Qaleh Airport  is a public use airport located near Yangi Qaleh, Takhar, Afghanistan.

See also
List of airports in Afghanistan

References

External links 
 Airport record for Yangi Qaleh Airport at Landings.com.

Airports in Afghanistan
Buildings and structures in Takhar Province